The Škoda 15 cm K10 was a naval gun of the Austro-Hungarian Empire that was used by the Austro-Hungarian Navy during World War I. The gun was actually 149.1 mm, but the classification system for artillery rounded up to the next highest centimeter.  The 15 cm K10 was called cannon 149/47 by the Italians and was used by the Italian Navy as coastal artillery during World War II.

Construction  
The Škoda 15 cm K10 was developed and built by Škoda at the Pilsen works.  The barrel was made of steel with a horizontal sliding breech block and the gun used separate loading ammunition with a cartridge case and bagged charge.

History 
They were used as secondary armament on the four battleships of the Tegetthoff-class. Each ship had six guns per side mounted on pedestal mounts in casemates amidships. After World War I  was delivered to Italy as a war reparation. Tegetthoff was decommissioned and remained in Venice until 1923 when it was moved to La Spezia to be scrapped in 1925 . The guns recovered from Tegetthof were assigned to coastal batteries in Libya and Croatia where they were used in World War II.  The barrel, pedestal and semi-circular armored shield from the casemates were reused, but the mounts were modified to increase elevation to +35 ° and traverse to 360°.  The only remaining complete 15 cm/50 gun of the four-gun battery Batterie Madonna is located on the island of Veli Brioni near Pula Croatia.  The engravings on this gun have been obscured by rust, but it appears that this gun is serial number 15 and was manufactured in 1912.

Ammunition 

The gun was able to fire:
 Armor Piercing - 
 High Explosive-

Notes

References

External links 
 http://www.navweaps.com/Weapons/WNAust_59-50_Skoda.php
 http://xoomer.virgilio.it/ramius/Militaria/artiglierie_2gm.html

150 mm artillery
World War I naval weapons
World War I artillery of Austria-Hungary
Naval guns of Austria-Hungary
Naval guns of Italy
World War II artillery of Italy
Coastal artillery